Antoine Gutierrez (born 7 January 1953) is a French former professional racing cyclist. He rode in four editions of the Tour de France.

References

External links
 

1953 births
Living people
French male cyclists